Kassimou Djae, better known by his stage name Alonzo, is a French rapper and singer who is signed to Def Jam France.

He started rapping from 2002 onwards and was part of the Marseille-based hip hop band Psy 4 de la Rime as Segnor Alonzo alongside band members Don Vincenzo (real name Illiassa Issilame), Soprano (real name Saïd M'Roubaba) and DJ Sya Styles (real name Rachid Aït Baar).

In 2010, he released a solo album Les temps modernes. His 2012 album Amour, gloire & cité (aka AG&C) contains collaborations with a number of artists such as Kenza Farah, Soprano and L'Algérino. His two next albums Règlement de comptes and Avenue de Saint-Antoine are certified gold.

Discography

Albums
As part of Psy 4 de la Rime
2002: Block Party
2005: Enfants de la lune	
2008: Les cités d'or
2013: 4eme dimension

Solo

EPs

Singles

*Did not appear in the official Belgian Ultratop 50 charts, but rather in the bubbling under Ultratip charts.

Other songs

As featured artist

References

External links
Psy4 de la Rime Official website

1982 births
Living people
French people of Comorian descent
Musicians from Marseille
Rappers from Bouches-du-Rhône